Ian Stuart Hanlin is a Canadian voice actor based in Vancouver.

Originally from Cole Harbour, Nova Scotia, he is known for his voice roles of Sunburst in My Little Pony: Friendship Is Magic, Lance Richmond in Nexo Knights, Acronix in Ninjago: Masters of Spinjitzu and Ralph in Fruit Ninja: Frenzy Force.

Personal life
Hanlin has been dating Caitlyn Bairstow since 2017. They first met while recording Nexo Knights. They live together and own a dog named Nester.

Filmography

Animation

Film

Video games

Live-action

Awards and nominations

 Leo Awards - Best Performance in an Animation Program (2021) – Winner
 UBCP/ACTRA Awards -  Best Voice (2022) – Winner
 SOVAS Awards - Outstanding Animation Character - Film or TV - Best Voiceover (2022)  – Nominee

References

External links

Living people
Canadian male video game actors
Canadian male voice actors
Male actors from Halifax, Nova Scotia
Male actors from Vancouver
People from Cole Harbour, Nova Scotia
Year of birth missing (living people)